is a Japanese former professional sumo wrestler from Sendai, Miyagi Prefecture. He did not miss a single bout in his 22-year professional career, and holds the record for the most consecutive matches fought, at 1,630. After his retirement from active competition he was an elder of the Japan Sumo Association and a coach.

Career
He made his debut in March 1964, joining Nishonoseki stable.  He reached the top makuuchi division for the first time in January 1975. In only his fourth top division tournament he was a tournament runner-up, won a sanshō (for Fighting Spirit) and earned a kinboshi for defeating a yokozuna. He was never to achieve any of those things again, but he fought in the top division for 62 tournaments in total. He made his san'yaku debut in September 1975 at komusubi and in October of that year he followed the former ōzeki Daikirin to the newly established Oshiogawa stable. He dropped into the jūryō division in 1981, but fought his way back, and an 8-7 score at maegashira 1 in May 1983 took him to his highest rank of sekiwake, which he held for just one tournament. This was his second and final appearance in the san'yaku ranks, 47 tournaments after his first - the longest such gap since the six tournaments per year schedule began in 1958. It had also taken him 116 tournaments from his professional debut to reach sekiwake, which is the slowest ever. In 1985 he surpassed Fujizakura's record of 1,543 consecutive career appearances, and when he retired in July 1986, having not missed any matches since his debut, he had set a new record of 1,630 consecutive bouts. He was nearly 38 years old, having been an active wrestler for over 22 years.

Retirement from sumo
After retirement from active competition he became an elder in the Japan Sumo Association (at Deputy Director level) under the name Shiranui Oyakata. He coached at the Oshiogawa and Oguruma stables and reached the Sumo Association's mandatory retirement age of 65 in November 2013.

Fighting style
Aobajo was a yotsu-sumo wrestler, preferring a hidari-yotsu, or right hand outside, left hand inside grip on his opponent's mawashi. His most common winning kimarite was yori-kiri (force out). He also regularly used tsuri-dashi (the lift out) and sukuinage (the scoop throw).

Career record

See also
List of sumo record holders
List of sumo tournament top division runners-up
List of sumo tournament second division champions
Glossary of sumo terms
List of past sumo wrestlers
List of sekiwake

References

1948 births
Living people
Japanese sumo wrestlers
Sportspeople from Sendai
Sumo people from Miyagi Prefecture
Sekiwake